Goddess on the Throne, is a terracotta figurine found at the site of the Tjerrtorja spinning mill in Pristina, the capital city of Kosovo, in 1956. The seated terracotta figure is a well-preserved specimen of small Neolithic plastic Vinca culture (also known as Turdas culture in Kosovo). It measures 18.5 cm high and is dated to 5700–4500 BC.

The figurine represents a female deity, reflecting the cult of the great mother idol. It is preserved in the Kosovo Museum, which has adopted the idol as its logo. One of the most precious archaeological artifacts of Kosovo, it has also been adopted as the symbol of the city of Pristina.

The figurine was discovered by experts from the National Museum of Serbia in 1956. Goddess on the Throne was stolen in late 1998 by the Serbian Academy of Sciences and Arts Gallery for their exhibition titled Arheološko blago Kosova i Metohije - od neolita do ranog Srednjeg veka (Archeological Treasure of Kosovo and Metohija - from the Neolithic Period to Middle Ages). Following the Kosovo War the figure was kept in Belgrade. In 2002, the-then President of the Coordination Center for Kosovo and Metohija Nebojša Čović returned the figurine to Priština as "a sign of good will towards Kosovo Albanians". The figurine became a symbol of the culture of Kosovo Albanians.

Gallery

Annotations

References

External links
 The Goddess on the Throne 
 'Tjerrtorja' Archeological Site (listed since 1955)

6th-millennium BC works
5th-millennium BC works
1956 archaeological discoveries
Vinča culture
Terracotta sculptures
Figurines
Sculptures of goddesses